Santa Maria del Quartiere is a Baroque-style church in the quarter of the Oltretorrente of the city of Parma, Italy.

History
The church was built from 1604 to 1619, on the site of a prior chapel dedicated to Mary, located in a site inside the walls, where troops were traditionally quartered, thus the name. The design has been attributed to the Ferrarese architect Giovan Battista Aleotti. Atypical for most post-Reformation rectangular church naves, the nave of this church is a centralized hexagonal plan.

The presbytery includes frescoes (1626) by Giulio Orlandini. The large and crowded fresco of the Trinity with angels and with the Ascended Virgin and saints in Paradise (1626-1629) covers the cupola, and was work by Pier Antonio Bernabei and his pupils: his brother Alessandro and Giovanni Maria Conti della Camera. The decoration of the chapels occurred in nineteenth centuries, and has works by Tommaso Bandini, Giovanni Gaibazzi, Francesco Scaramuzza, and Francesco Pescatori.

References

Maria Quartiere
Baroque architecture in Parma
Maria Quartiere
Roman Catholic churches completed in 1619
Hexagonal buildings
Centralized-plan churches in Italy
1619 establishments in Italy